Lillian Doris Ogilvie (4 July 1912 – 8 September 2003), known as Doris Ogilvie, was a Canadian diver.

Ogilvie competed in the women's 3 metre springboard event at the 1932 Summer Olympics. She also competed in the 1930 British Empire Games, where she won a silver medal in the 3m springboard event, and at the 1934 British Empire Games where she won a bronze medal, also in the 3m springboard event.

References

External links
 
 

1912 births
2003 deaths
Canadian female divers
Olympic divers of Canada
Divers at the 1932 Summer Olympics
Divers from Toronto
Divers at the 1930 British Empire Games
Divers at the 1934 British Empire Games
Commonwealth Games silver medallists for Canada
Commonwealth Games bronze medallists for Canada
Commonwealth Games medallists in diving
20th-century Canadian women
Medallists at the 1930 British Empire Games
Medallists at the 1934 British Empire Games